Suillus glandulosipes is a species of edible mushroom in the genus Suillus. It was first described scientifically by American mycologists Harry D. Thiers and Alexander H. Smith in 1964.

References

External links

glandulosipes
Edible fungi
Fungi of North America
Fungi described in 1964